Marcoule Nuclear Site is a nuclear facility in the Chusclan and Codolet communes, near Bagnols-sur-Cèze in the Gard department of France, which is in the tourist, wine and agricultural Côtes-du-Rhône region. The plant is around 25 km north west of Avignon, on the banks of the Rhone.

Operational since 1956, Marcoule is a gigantic site run by the atomic energy organization Commissariat à l'Énergie Atomique (CEA) and Areva NC and is known as CEA VALRHO Marcoule. The first industrial and military plutonium experiments took place in Marcoule. Diversification of the site was started in the 1970s with the creation of the Phénix prototype fast breeder reactor, which was operational until 2009, and is nowadays an important site for decommissioning nuclear facilities activities.

 the Phénix reactor was planned to be succeeded by the sodium-cooled fast reactor ASTRID (Advanced Sodium Technical Reactor for Industrial Demonstration), foreseen to become operational in the 2030s. However, in 2019 the ASTRID project was closed.

Since 1995, the MELOX factory has been producing MOX from a mix of uranium and plutonium oxides. MOX is used to recycle plutonium from nuclear fuel; this plutonium comes from the COGEMA La Hague site.

The ATelier Alpha et Laboratoires pour ANalyses, Transuraniens et Etudes de retraitement (ATALANTE) is a CEA laboratory investigating the issues of nuclear reprocessing of nuclear fuel and of radioactive waste.

Reactors
The site housed a number of the first generation French UNGG reactors, all of which have been shut down. Since then, it has also operated two heavy water reactors to produce tritium.  Cooling for all of the plants comes from the Rhône river.

2011 explosion 
On 12 September 2011, there was an explosion in an oven used to melt metallic waste of a "weak and very weak" level of radioactivity, killing one person, and injuring four.  The explosion happened in the Centraco centre, used by Socodei, a sister company of Électricité de France.  A safety cordon was set up around the plant by fire officers because of the risk of leakage.

CEA VALRHO Marcoule 
The CEA in Marcoule have numerous laboratories and research institutes which carry out research into;

 Nuclear reactor waste recycling
 Future nuclear reactor technology (including a fourth generation prototype reactor to be ready by 2030)
 Nuclear decommissioning technology

A science museum for the general public, Visiatome Marcoule, devoted to energy issues is located by the Marcoule site.

While most facilities are located at the main Marcoule site, a small number of facilities at Pierrelatte (located close at the Tricastin Nuclear Site) do also belong to the Marcoule Nuclear Site.

In 2007 over 500 million euros was spent supporting the work of the 30 laboratories.

Gallery

References

External links

The French Nuclear Safety Authority - French Nuclear Safety Authority
Visiatome Marcoule, science museum
G2 (and G3), Nuclear Engineering International wall chart, December 1959

Energy infrastructure completed in 1956
Nuclear research institutes in France
Nuclear history of France
Nuclear technology in France
Military nuclear reactors
Buildings and structures in Gard
Former nuclear power stations in France
Nuclear power stations with closed reactors
Nuclear reprocessing sites
20th-century architecture in France